The 1999 Arizona Diamondbacks season was the franchise's 2nd season in Major League Baseball and their 2nd season at Bank One Ballpark and in Phoenix, Arizona. They began the season on April 5 at home against the Los Angeles Dodgers, and looked to improve on their 1998 expansion season. They looked to contend in what was a strong National League West Division. They finished the season with a highly surprising record of 100-62, good enough for the NL West division title, becoming the fastest expansion team in MLB history to reach the playoffs. They also set all-time franchise highs in hits (1,566), runs (908), batting average (.277), on-base percentage (.347), and slugging percentage (.459). In the NLDS, however, they fell in four games to the New York Mets on Todd Pratt's infamous home run. Randy Johnson would win the NL Cy Young Award and become the third pitcher to win the Cy Young Award in both leagues.

Offseason
October 26, 1998: Izzy Molina was signed as a free agent with the Arizona Diamondbacks.
November 10, 1998: Dante Powell was traded by the San Francisco Giants to the Arizona Diamondbacks for Alan Embree.
November 13, 1998: Greg Swindell signed as a free agent with the Arizona Diamondbacks.
December 2, 1998: Ernie Young was signed as a free agent with the Arizona Diamondbacks.
December 10, 1998: Randy Johnson signed as a free agent with the Arizona Diamondbacks.
January 22, 1999: Ken Huckaby was signed as a free agent with the Arizona Diamondbacks.
February 18, 1999: Dale Sveum was signed as a free agent with the Arizona Diamondbacks.
March 30, 1999: Izzy Molina was traded by the Arizona Diamondbacks with Ben Ford to the New York Yankees for Darren Holmes and cash.
March 30, 1999: Aaron Small was released by the Arizona Diamondbacks.

Regular season
In his first season with the club, Randy Johnson helped the second-year franchise win the NL West title. He joined Gaylord Perry and Pedro Martínez as one of only three pitchers to win Cy Young Awards in both leagues. Johnson led the NL with a 2.48 ERA and led both leagues with 364 strikeouts, 12 complete games and 271 innings pitched.

Opening Day starters
Tony Batista
Jay Bell
Andy Benes
Steve Finley
Luis Gonzalez
Travis Lee
Damian Miller
Matt Williams
Tony Womack

Notable transactions
May 9, 1999: Dale Sveum was released by the Arizona Diamondbacks.
June 2, 1999: Lyle Overbay was drafted by the Arizona Diamondbacks in the 18th round of the 1999 amateur draft. Player signed June 8, 1999.
 June 12, 1999: Dan Plesac was traded by the Toronto Blue Jays to the Arizona Diamondbacks for Tony Batista and John Frascatore.

Season standings

Record vs. opponents

Game log

|-  style="text-align:center; background:#fbb;"
| 1 || April 5 || @ Dodgers || 6–8 (11 inn.) || Shaw (1-0) || Frascatore (0-1) || None || Dodger Stadium || 53,109 || 0–1 || 
|-  style="text-align:center; background:#fbb;"
| 2 || April 6 || @ Dodgers || 2–3 (10 inn.) || Mills (1-0) || Anderson (0-1) || None || Dodger Stadium || 33,139 || 0–2 || 
|-  style="text-align:center; background:#fbb;"
| 3 || April 7 || @ Dodgers || 4–6 || Valdez (1-0) || Benes (0-1) || Shaw (1) || Dodger Stadium || 29,042 || 0–3 || 
|-  style="text-align:center; background:#fbb;"
| 4 || April 9 || @ Braves || 2–3 (10 inn.) || Rocker (1-0) || Frascatore (0-2) || None || Turner Field || 34,939 || 0–4 || 
|-  style="text-align:center; background:#bfb;"
| 5 || April 10 || @ Braves || 8–3 || Johnson (1-0) || Glavine (0-2) || None || Turner Field || 44,531 || 1–4 || 
|-  style="text-align:center; background:#fbb;"
| 6 || April 11 || @ Braves || 2–3 || McGlinchy (1-0) || Olson (0-1) || None || Turner Field || 32,454 || 1–5 || 
|-  style="text-align:center; background:#bfb;"
| 7 || April 12 || Dodgers || 12–6 || Benes (1-1) || Park (0-1) || None || Bank One Ballpark || 46,929 || 2–5 || 
|-  style="text-align:center; background:#bfb;"
| 8 || April 13 || Dodgers || 7–6 (16 inn.) || Chouinard (1-0) || Mlicki (0-1) || None || Bank One Ballpark || 31,197 || 3–5 || 
|-  style="text-align:center; background:#bfb;"
| 9 || April 14 || Dodgers || 6–2 || Daal (1-0) || Perez (0-2) || None || Bank One Ballpark || 30,561 || 4–5 || 
|-  style="text-align:center; background:#fbb;"
| 10 || April 15 || Dodgers || 1–8 || Dreifort (2-0) || Johnson (1-1) || None || Bank One Ballpark || 36,105 || 4–6 || 
|-  style="text-align:center; background:#bfb;"
| 11 || April 16 || Giants || 10–4 || Stottlemyre (1-0) || Gardner || Anderson (1) || Bank One Ballpark || 34,516 || 5–6 || 
|-  style="text-align:center; background:#fbb;"
| 12 || April 17 || Giants || 5–8 || Rueter (1-0) || Benes (1-2) || None || Bank One Ballpark || 36,674 || 5–7 || 
|-  style="text-align:center; background:#bfb;"
| 13 || April 18 || Giants || 12–3 || Reynoso (1-0) || Ortiz (1-2) || None || Bank One Ballpark || 36,043 || 6–7 || 
|-  style="text-align:center; background:#bfb;"
| 14 || April 19 || Phillies || 3–2 || Daal (2-0) || Perez (0-1) || Swindell (1) || Bank One Ballpark || 29,704 || 7–7 || 
|-  style="text-align:center; background:#bfb;"
| 15 || April 20 || Phillies || 8–1 || Johnson (2-1) || Spoljaric (0-2) || None || Bank One Ballpark || 30,546 || 8–7 || 
|-  style="text-align:center; background:#bfb;"
| 16 || April 21 || Phillies || 4–2 || Stottlemyre (2-0) || Schilling (3-1) || Olson (1) || Bank One Ballpark || 31,421 || 9–7 || 
|-  style="text-align:center; background:#bfb;"
| 17 || April 23 || @ Padres || 10–6 || Benes (2-2) || Hitchcock (1-1) || None || Qualcomm Stadium || 20,437 || 10–7 || 
|-  style="text-align:center; background:#fbb;"
| 18 || April 24 || @ Padres || 2–7 || Williams (1-0) || Daal (2-1) || None || Qualcomm Stadium || 61,674 || 10–8 || 
|-  style="text-align:center; background:#bfb;"
| 19 || April 25 || @ Padres || 5–3 (11 inn.) || Swindell (1-0) || Miceli (1-1) || Olson (2) || Qualcomm Stadium || 26,684 || 11–8 || 
|-  style="text-align:center; background:#fbb;"
| 20 || April 26 || @ Astros || 2–5 || Lima (3-1) || Stottlemyre (2-1) || Wagner (6) || Astrodome || 18,328 || 11–9 || 
|-  style="text-align:center; background:#fbb;"
| 21 || April 27 || @ Astros || 0–11 || Reynolds (4-1) || Reynoso (1-1) || None || Astrodome || 19,396 || 11–10 || 
|-  style="text-align:center; background:#bfb;"
| 22 || April 28 || @ Astros || 10–6 || Holmes (1-0) || Wagner (1-1) || None || Astrodome || 19,605 || 12–10 || 
|-  style="text-align:center; background:#fbb;"
| 23 || April 29 || @ Astros || 2–5 || Hampton (2-1) || Daal (2-2) || Wagner (7) || Astrodome || 21,506 || 12–11 || 
|-  style="text-align:center; background:#bfb;"
| 24 || April 30 || @ Brewers || 3–2 || Holmes (2-0) || Myers (1-1) || Olson (3) || Milwaukee County Stadium || 17,008 || 13–11 || 
|-

|-  style="text-align:center; background:#bfb;"
| 25 || May 1 || @ Brewers || 5–3 || Stottlemyre (3-1) || Abbott (0-4) || Olson (4) || Milwaukee County Stadium || 28,415 || 14–11 || 
|-  style="text-align:center; background:#fbb;"
| 26|| May 2 || @ Brewers || 5–6 || Weathers (2-0) || Holmes (2-1) || None || Milwaukee County Stadium || 13,943 || 14–13 || 
|-  style="text-align:center; background:#fbb;"
| 27|| May 3 || @ Reds || 3–4 || Williamson (2-1) || Olson (0-2) || Wickman (4) || Cinergy Field || 23,811 || 14–12 || 
|-  style="text-align:center; background:#fbb;"
| 28|| May 4 || @ Reds || 4–6 || Reyes (1-0) || Daal (2-3) || Graves (4) || Cinergy Field || 14,660 || 14–14 || 
|-  style="text-align:center; background:#bfb;"
| 29|| May 5 || @ Reds || 5–1 || Johnson (3-1) || Avery (1-3) || None || Cinergy Field || 16,247 || 15–14 || 
|-  style="text-align:center; background:#bfb;"
| 30|| May 7 || Mets || 14–7 || Stottlemyre (4-1) || Hershiser (2-3) || None || Bank One Ballpark || 38,154 || 16–14 || 
|-  style="text-align:center; background:#fbb;"
| 31|| May 8 || Mets || 2–4 || Yoshii (2-3) || Benes (2-3) || Benitez (1) || Bank One Ballpark || 37,593 || 16–15 || 
|-  style="text-align:center; background:#bfb;"
| 32|| May 9 || Mets || 11–6 || Daal (3-3) || Reed (2-1) || None || Bank One Ballpark || 38,250 || 17–15 || 
|-  style="text-align:center; background:#bfb;"
| 33|| May 10 || Expos || 7–6 || Olson (1-2) || Ayala (0-3) || None || Bank One Ballpark || 31,208 || 18–15 || 
|-  style="text-align:center; background:#bfb;"
| 34|| May 11 || Expos || 4–3 (10 inn.) || Olson (2-2) || Mota (0-1) || None || Bank One Ballpark || 28,103 || 19–15 || 
|-  style="text-align:center; background:#bfb;"
| 35|| May 12 || Expos || 8–6 || Telemaco (1-0) || Smart (0-1) || None || Bank One Ballpark || 30,753 || 20–15 || 
|-  style="text-align:center; background:#fbb;"
| 36|| May 14 || Rockies || 1–4 || Bohanon (6-1) || Benes (2-4) || None || Bank One Ballpark || 38,894 || 20–16 || 
|-  style="text-align:center; background:#bfb;"
| 37|| May 15 || Rockies || 9–2 || Johnson (4-1) || Kile (2-3) || None || Bank One Ballpark || 40,853 || 21–16 || 
|-  style="text-align:center; background:#fbb;"
| 38|| May 16 || Rockies || 1–5 || Astacio (4-3) || Daal (3-4) || None || Bank One Ballpark || 38,869 || 21–17 || 
|-  style="text-align:center; background:#bfb;"
| 39|| May 17 || @ Giants || 12–1 || Frascatore (1-2) || Estes (2-3) || None || 3Com Park || 10,846 || 22–17 || 
|-  style="text-align:center; background:#bfb;"
| 40|| May 18 || @ Giants || 7–3 || Reynoso (2-1) || Brock (4-3) || None || 3Com Park || 10,900 || 23–17 || 
|-  style="text-align:center; background:#fbb;"
| 41|| May 19 || @ Giants || 3–8 || Rueter (3-2) || Benes (2-5) || None || 3Com Park || 15,793 || 23–18 || 
|-  style="text-align:center; background:#fbb;"
| 42|| May 20 || @ Rockies || 4–8 || Kile (3-3) || Johnson (4-2) || None || Coors Field || 40,021 || 23–19 || 
|-  style="text-align:center; background:#fbb;"
| 43|| May 21 || @ Rockies || 7–8 (11 inn.) || Leskanic (1-1) || Frascatore (1-3) || None || Coors Field || 44,205 || 23–20 || 
|-  style="text-align:center; background:#bfb;"
| 44|| May 22 || @ Rockies || 8–3 || Daal (4-4) || Jones (1-3) || None || Coors Field || 48,594 || 24–20 || 
|-  style="text-align:center; background:#fbb;"
| 45|| May 23 || @ Rockies || 6–7 || McElroy (2-0) || Olson (2-3) || None || Coors Field || 46,299 || 24–21 || 
|-  style="text-align:center; background:#bfb;"
| 46|| May 24 || Padres || 6–5 || Benes (3-5) || Ashby (5-3) || Olson (5) || Bank One Ballpark || 34,745 || 25–21 || 
|-  style="text-align:center; background:#bfb;"
| 47|| May 25 || Padres || 4–0 || Johnson (5-2) || Hitchcock (3-4) || None || Bank One Ballpark || 34,273 || 26–21 || 
|-  style="text-align:center; background:#bfb;"
| 48|| May 26 || Padres || 3–2 (11 inn.) || Olson (3-3) || Miceli (2-2) || None || Bank One Ballpark || 33,048 || 27–21 || 
|-  style="text-align:center; background:#bfb;"
| 49|| May 28 || @ Mets || 2–1 || Daal (5-4) || Reed (3-2) || Olson (6) || Shea Stadium || 32,114 || 28–21 || 
|-  style="text-align:center; background:#bfb;"
| 50|| May 29 || @ Mets || 8–7 || Reynoso (3-3) || Beltran (1-1) || Kim (1) || Shea Stadium || 35,167 || 29–21 || 
|-  style="text-align:center; background:#bfb;"
| 51|| May 30 || @ Mets || 10–1 || Johnson (6-2) || Yoshii (5-4) || None || Shea Stadium || 38,302 || 30–21 || 
|-  style="text-align:center; background:#bfb;"
| 52|| May 30 || @ Expos || 8–5 (10 inn.) || Holmes (3-1) || Kline (1-2) || Olson (7) || Olympic Stadium || 5,048 || 31–21 || 
|-

|-  style="text-align:center; background:#fbb;"
| 53|| June 1 || @ Expos || 8–10 || Mota (1-1) || Frascatore (1-4) || Urbina (12) || Olympic Stadium || 5,188 || 31–22 || 
|-  style="text-align:center; background:#bfb;"
| 54|| June 2 || @ Expos || 15–2 || Daal (6-4) || Vazquez (2-4) || None || Olympic Stadium || 5,395 || 32–22 || 
|-  style="text-align:center; background:#bfb;"
| 55|| June 4 || Rangers || 11–3 || Johnson (7-2) || Clark (3-4) || None || Bank One Ballpark || 41,029 || 33–22 || 
|-  style="text-align:center; background:#fbb;"
| 56|| June 5 || Rangers || 8–9 || Venafro (2-0) || Holmes (3-2) || Wetteland (19) || Bank One Ballpark || 41,820 || 33–23 || 
|-  style="text-align:center; background:#bfb;"
| 57|| June 6 || Rangers || 4–2 || Benes (4-5) || Helling (5-6) || Olson (8) || Bank One Ballpark || 34,353 || 34–23 || 
|-  style="text-align:center; background:#fbb;"
| 58|| June 7 || Cubs || 6–7 || Adams (2-1) || Holmes (3-3) || None || Bank One Ballpark || 44,083 || 34–24 || 
|-  style="text-align:center; background:#fbb;"
| 59|| June 8 || Cubs || 3–5 || Aguilera (6-2) || Olson (3-4) || Adams (3) || Bank One Ballpark || 39,308 || 34–25 || 
|-  style="text-align:center; background:#bfb;"
| 60|| June 9 || Cubs || 8–7 || Johnson (8-2) || Mulholland (3-2) || Nunez (1) || Bank One Ballpark || 46,033 || 35–25 || 
|-  style="text-align:center; background:#bfb;"
| 61|| June 11 || @ Angels || 12–2 || Reynoso (4-1) || Hill (3-5) || None || Edison International Field || 37,042 || 36–25 || 
|-  style="text-align:center; background:#fbb;"
| 62|| June 12 || @ Angels || 3–4 || Petkovsek (5-1) || Benes (4-6) || Percival (18) || Edison International Field || 37,916 || 36–26 || 
|-  style="text-align:center; background:#bfb;"
| 63|| June 13 || @ Angels || 3–1 (13 inn.) || Nunez (1-0) || Petkovsek (5-2) || Olson (9) || Edison International Field || 29,176 || 37–26 || 
|-  style="text-align:center; background:#bfb;"
| 64|| June 14 || Marlins || 2–0 || Johnson (9-2) || Dempster (3-2) || Olson (10) || Bank One Ballpark || 39,314 || 38–26 || 
|-  style="text-align:center; background:#bfb;"
| 65|| June 15 || Marlins || 4–3 || Anderson (1-1) || Springer (2-8) || Olson (11) || Bank One Ballpark || 30,096 || 39–26 || 
|-  style="text-align:center; background:#bfb;"
| 66|| June 16 || Marlins || 12–6 || Reynoso (5-1) || Meadows (5-7) || None || Bank One Ballpark || 30,567 || 40–26 || 
|-  style="text-align:center; background:#fbb;"
| 67|| June 18 || Braves || 0–6 || Smoltz (8-2) || Benes (4-7) || None || Bank One Ballpark || 41,499 || 40–27 || 
|-  style="text-align:center; background:#bfb;"
| 68|| June 19 || Braves || 7–3 || Daal (7-4) || Perez (4-4) || None || Bank One Ballpark || 46,726 || 41–27 || 
|-  style="text-align:center; background:#fbb;"
| 69|| June 20 || Braves || 4–10 || Glavine (5-7) || Johnson (9-3) || None || Bank One Ballpark || 44,083 || 41–28 || 
|-  style="text-align:center; background:#fbb;"
| 70|| June 21 || Reds || 4–7 (10 inn.) || White (1-2) || Nunez (1-1) || Graves (8) || Bank One Ballpark || 32,400 || 41–29 || 
|-  style="text-align:center; background:#fbb;"
| 71|| June 22 || Reds || 7–8 || Reyes (2-1) || Vosberg (0-1) || Graves (9) || Bank One Ballpark || 30,420 || 41–30 || 
|-  style="text-align:center; background:#fbb;"
| 72|| June 23 || Reds || 7–9 || Avery (5-6) || Benes (4-8) || Williamson (8) || Bank One Ballpark || 31,648 || 41–31 || 
|-  style="text-align:center; background:#bfb;"
| 73|| June 24 || Cardinals || 8–7 || Nunez (2-1) || Bottalico (1-4) || None || Bank One Ballpark || 41,459|| 42–31 || 
|-  style="text-align:center; background:#fbb;"
| 74|| June 25 || Cardinals || 0–1 || Jimenez (4-7) || Johnson (9-4) || None || Bank One Ballpark ||  45,540 || 42–32 || 
|-  style="text-align:center; background:#fbb;"
| 75|| June 26 || Cardinals || 1–2 (10 inn.) || Aybar (4-1) || Nunez (2-2) || None || Bank One Ballpark || 48,053 || 42–33 || 
|-  style="text-align:center; background:#bfb;"
| 76|| June 27 || Cardinals || 3–2 (10 inn.) || Nunez (3-2) || Bottalico (1-5) || None || Bank One Ballpark || 44,458 || 43–33 || 
|-  style="text-align:center; background:#fbb;"
| 77|| June 29 || @ Reds || 4–5 || Graves (5-3) || Padilla (0-1) || None || Cinergy Field || 24,672 || 43–34 || 
|-  style="text-align:center; background:#fbb;"
| 78|| June 30 || @ Reds || 0–2 || Villone (3-2) || Johnson (9-5) || Williamson (10) || Cinergy Field || 29,560 || 43–35 || 
|-

|-  style="text-align:center; background:#fbb;"
| 79|| July 1 || @ Reds || 1–2 (10 inn.) || Williamson (7-2) || Plesac (0-4) || None || Cinergy Field || 18,394 || 43–36 || 
|-  style="text-align:center; background:#bfb;"
| 80|| July 2 || @ Cardinals || 9–5 || Anderson (2-1) || Oliver (4-6) || None || Busch Memorial Stadium || 39,693 || 44–36 || 
|-  style="text-align:center; background:#fbb;"
| 81|| July 3 || @ Cardinals || 1–2 (10 inn.) || Painter (1-4) || Kim (0-1) || None || Busch Memorial Stadium || 41,278 || 44–37 || 
|-  style="text-align:center; background:#bfb;"
| 82|| July 4 || @ Cardinals || 17–5 || Benes (5-8) || Croushore (1-2) || None || Busch Memorial Stadium || 38,041 || 45–37 || 
|-  style="text-align:center; background:#fbb;"
| 83|| July 5 || @ Cardinals || 0–1 || Jimenez (5-8) || Johnson (9-6) || None || Busch Memorial Stadium || 33,700 || 45–38 || 
|-  style="text-align:center; background:#fbb;"
| 84|| July 6 || Astros || 1–3 || Lima (12-4) || Daal (7-5) || None || Bank One Ballpark || 31,672 || 45–39 || 
|-  style="text-align:center; background:#bfb;"
| 85|| July 7 || Astros || 13–7 || Chouinard (2-0) || Miller (0-1) || None || Bank One Ballpark || 31,004 || 46–39 || 
|-  style="text-align:center; background:#bfb;"
| 86|| July 8 || Astros || 8–7 (11 inn.) || Olson (4-4) || Williams (0-1) || None || Bank One Ballpark || 33,700 || 47–39 || 
|-  style="text-align:center; background:#fbb;"
| 87|| July 9 || Athletics || 2–5 || Heredia (5-5) || Benes (5-9) || Taylor (21) || Bank One Ballpark || 33,635 || 47–40 || 
|-  style="text-align:center; background:#fbb;"
| 88|| July 10 || Athletics || 0–2 || Hudson (5-1) || Johnson (9-7) || Taylor (22) || Bank One Ballpark || 36,042 || 47–41 || 
|-  style="text-align:center; background:#bfb;"
| 89|| July 11 || Athletics || 7–4 || Daal (8-5) || Haynes (6-7) || Mantei (11) || Bank One Ballpark || 36,632 || 48–41 || 
|-  style="text-align:center; background:#fbb;"
| 90|| July 15 || @ Rangers || 2–3 || Venafro (3-1) || Mantei (1-3) || None || The Ballpark in Arlington || 33,328 || 48–42 || 
|-  style="text-align:center; background:#fbb;"
| 91|| July 16 || @ Rangers || 8–9 || Wetteland (3-3) || Chouinard (2-1) || None || The Ballpark in Arlington || 38,802 || 48–43 || 
|-  style="text-align:center; background:#bfb;"
| 92|| July 17 || @ Rangers || 8–6 (10 inn.) || Plesac (1-4) || Wetteland (3-4) || Mantei (12) || The Ballpark in Arlington || 34,421 || 49–43 || 
|-  style="text-align:center; background:#fbb;"
| 93|| July 18 || @ Mariners || 7–8 (10 inn.) || Mesa (1-4) || Kim (0-2) || None || Safeco Field || 44,705 || 49–44 || 
|-  style="text-align:center; background:#fbb;"
| 94|| July 19 || @ Mariners || 5–7 || Meche (1-0) || Anderson (2-2) || None || Safeco Field || 44,287 || 49–45 || 
|-  style="text-align:center; background:#bfb;"
| 95|| July 20 || @ Mariners || 6–0 || Johnson (10-7) || Marte (0-1) || None || Safeco Field || 44,884 || 50–45 || 
|-  style="text-align:center; background:#bfb;"
| 96|| July 21 || @ Astros || 7–4 || Chouinard (3-1) || Powell (4-2) || Mantei (13) || Astrodome || 23,985 || 51–45 || 
|-  style="text-align:center; background:#bfb;"
| 97|| July 22 || @ Astros || 2–1 || Benes (6-9) || Lima (13-5) || Mantei (14) || Astrodome || 31,861 || 52–45 || 
|-  style="text-align:center; background:#bfb;"
| 98|| July 23 || Dodgers || 10–1 || Daal (9-5) || Perez (2-10) || None || Bank One Ballpark || 43,031 || 53–45 || 
|-  style="text-align:center; background:#bfb;"
| 99|| July 24 || Dodgers || 3–0 || Anderson (3-2) || Dreifort (8-9) || Mantei (15) || Bank One Ballpark || 42,824 || 54–45 || 
|-  style="text-align:center; background:#fbb;"
| 100|| July 25 || Dodgers || 1–2 || Brown (11-6) || Johnson (10-8) || Shaw (21) || Bank One Ballpark || 31,861 || 54–46 || 
|-  style="text-align:center; background:#bfb;"
| 101|| July 26 || @ Padres || 2–0 || Reynoso (6-1) || Hitchcock (9-8) || Mantei (16) || Qualcomm Stadium || 20,042 || 55–46 || 
|-  style="text-align:center; background:#bfb;"
| 102|| July 27 || @ Padres || 4–3 || Olson (5-4) || Reyes (2-2) || Mantei (17) || Qualcomm Stadium || 29,224 || 56–46 || 
|-  style="text-align:center; background:#bfb;"
| 103|| July 28 || @ Padres || 7–4 || Daal (10-5) || Boehringer (6-3) || Plesac (1) || Qualcomm Stadium || 28,806 || 57–46 || 
|-  style="text-align:center; background:#bfb;"
| 104|| July 30 || @ Dodgers || 6–5 || Chouinard (4-1) || Shaw (2-4) || Mantei (18) || Dodger Stadium || 45,839 || 58–46 || 
|-  style="text-align:center; background:#bfb;"
| 105|| July 31 || @ Dodgers || 4–2 || Johnson (11-8) || Valdez (8-9) || None || Dodger Stadium || 37,114 || 59–46 || 
|-

|-  style="text-align:center; background:#fbb;"
| 106|| August 1 || @ Dodgers || 2–4 || Masaoka (2-2) || Benes (6-10) || Shaw (22) || Dodger Stadium || 46,991 || 59–47 || 
|-  style="text-align:center; background:#bfb;"
| 107|| August 2 || Giants || 16–6 || Reynoso (7-1) || Rueter (9-6) || None || Bank One Ballpark || 40,470 || 60–47 || 
|-  style="text-align:center; background:#fbb;"
| 108|| August 3 || Giants || 1–3 || Hernandez (6-10) || Daal (10-6) || Nen (24) || Bank One Ballpark || 38,794 || 60–48 || 
|-  style="text-align:center; background:#bfb;"
| 109|| August 4 || Giants || 8–4 || Anderson (4-2) || Nathan (2-2) || None || Bank One Ballpark || 41,503 || 61–48 || 
|-  style="text-align:center; background:#fbb;"
| 110|| August 6 || @ Phillies || 2–4 (11 inn.) || Gomes (3-1) || Chouinard (4-2) || None || Veterans Stadium || 27,742 || 61–49 || 
|-  style="text-align:center; background:#bfb;"
| 111|| August 7 || @ Phillies || 8–2 || Benes (7-10) || Schilling (14-5) || Shaw (22) || Veterans Stadium || 18,766 || 62–49 || 
|-  style="text-align:center; background:#bfb;"
| 112|| August 8 || @ Phillies || 7–4 || Reynoso (8-1) || Ogea (6-10) || Mantei (19) || Veterans Stadium || 32,047 || 63–49 || 
|-  style="text-align:center; background:#bfb;"
| 113|| August 9 || @ Cubs || 10–7 || Daal (11-6) || Sanders (4-6) || None || Wrigley Field || 38,679 || 64–49 || 
|-  style="text-align:center; background:#bfb;"
| 114|| August 10 || @ Cubs || 3–1 || Swindell (2-0) || Lieber (8-6) || Olson (12) || Wrigley Field || 32,787 || 65–49 || 
|-  style="text-align:center; background:#bfb;"
| 115|| August 11 || @ Cubs || 7–5 (11 inn.) || Plesac (2-4) || Rain (0-1) || Olson (13) || Wrigley Field || 39,334 || 66–49 || 
|-  style="text-align:center; background:#fbb;"
| 116|| August 13 || Brewers || 1–3 || Nomo (10-5) || Benes (7-11) || Wickman (23) || Bank One Ballpark || 38,415 || 66–50 || 
|-  style="text-align:center; background:#fbb;"
| 117|| August 14 || Brewers || 2–4 || Karl (8-10) || Reynoso (8-2) || Wickman (24) || Bank One Ballpark || 40,937 || 66–51 || 
|-  style="text-align:center; background:#bfb;"
| 118|| August 15 || Brewers || 4–0 || Daal (12-6) || Pulsipher (3-3) || None || Bank One Ballpark || 32,869 || 67–51 || 
|-  style="text-align:center; background:#bfb;"
| 119|| August 16 || Cubs || 10–3 || Johnson (12-8) || Lieber (8-7) || None || Bank One Ballpark || 42,225 || 68–51 || 
|-  style="text-align:center; background:#bfb;"
| 120|| August 17 || Cubs || 4–0 || Anderson (5-2) || Lorraine (1-1) || None || Bank One Ballpark || 39,403 || 69–51 || 
|-  style="text-align:center; background:#bfb;"
| 121|| August 18 || Cubs || 3–1 || Benes (8-11) || Tapani (6-11) || Mantei (20) || Bank One Ballpark || 41,571 || 70–51 || 
|-  style="text-align:center; background:#fbb;"
| 122|| August 20 || @ Pirates || 4–5 || Ritchie (12-8) || Stottlemyre (4-2) || Williams (20) || Three Rivers Stadium || 23,934 || 70–52 || 
|-  style="text-align:center; background:#bfb;"
| 123|| August 21 || @ Pirates || 4–2 ||Johnson (13-8) || Anderson (1-1) || None || Three Rivers Stadium || 31,364 || 71–52 || 
|-  style="text-align:center; background:#bfb;"
| 124|| August 22 || @ Pirates || 7–5 || Daal (13-6) || Schmidt (10-9) || Mantei (21) || Three Rivers Stadium || 25,112 || 72–52 || 
|-  style="text-align:center; background:#bfb;"
| 125|| August 23 || @ Pirates || 2–1 || Reynoso (9-2) || Cordova (8-6) || Mantei (22) || Three Rivers Stadium || 11,768 || 73–52 || 
|-  style="text-align:center; background:#bfb;"
| 126|| August 24 || @ Marlins || 5–4 ||Benes (9-11) || Almanza (0-1) || Mantei (23) || Pro Player Stadium || 13,689 || 74–52 || 
|-  style="text-align:center; background:#bfb;"
| 127|| August 25 || @ Marlins || 7–2 || Stottlemyre (5-2) || Nunez (5-6) || None || Pro Player Stadium || 14,409 || 75–52 || 
|-  style="text-align:center; background:#bfb;"
| 128|| August 26 || @ Marlins || 12–2 || Johnson (14-8) || Meadows (10-13) || None || Pro Player Stadium || 13,521 || 76–52 || 
|-  style="text-align:center; background:#fbb;"
| 129|| August 27 || Mets || 3–6 ||Dotel (5-1) || Daal (13-7) || Benitez (16) || Bank One Ballpark || 42,581 || 76–53 || 
|-  style="text-align:center; background:#bfb;"
| 130|| August 28 || Mets || 7–2 || Reynoso (10-2) || Cook (10-4) || Mantei (24) || Bank One Ballpark || 47,076 || 77–53 || 
|-  style="text-align:center; background:#bfb;"
| 131|| August 29 || Mets || 8–4 || Anderson (6-2) || Leiter (10-9) || Olson (14) || Bank One Ballpark || 38,596 || 78–53 || 
|-  style="text-align:center; background:#bfb;"
| 132|| August 30 || Expos || 5–4 || Chouinard (5-2) || Batista (7-7) || Mantei (25) || Bank One Ballpark || 30,483 || 79–53 || 
|-  style="text-align:center; background:#fbb;"
| 133|| August 31 || Expos || 1–2 || Thurman (6-10) || Johnson (14-9) || Urbina (33) || Bank One Ballpark || 32,154 || 79–54 || 
|-

Roster

Player stats

Batting
Note: Pos = Position; G = Games played; AB = At bats; H = Hits; HR = Home runs; RBI = Runs batted in; Avg. = Batting average;

Other batters
Note: G = Games played; AB = At bats; H = Hits; HR = Home runs; RBI = Runs batted in; Avg. = Batting average

Starting pitchers
Note: G = Games pitched; IP = Innings pitched; W = Wins; L = Losses; ERA = Earned run average; SO = Strikeouts

Other pitchers
Note: G = Games pitched; IP = Innings pitched; W = Wins; L = Losses; ERA = Earned run average; SO = Strikeouts

Relief pitchers
Note: G = Games pitched; IP = Innings pitched; W = Wins; L = Losses; SV = Saves; ERA = Earned run average; SO = Strikeouts

NLDS

New York wins series, 3-1

Farm system

References

External links
Arizona Diamondbacks official web site 
1999 Arizona Diamondbacks at Baseball Reference
1999 Arizona Diamondbacks team page at www.baseball-almanac.com

Arizona Diamondbacks Season, 1999
Arizona Diamondbacks seasons
National League West champion seasons
Arizonia